Three Muslim sages: Avicenna, Suhrawardī, Ibn Arabī is a 1964 book by the Iranian philosopher Seyyed Hossein Nasr.

See also
 An Introduction to Islamic Cosmological Doctrines

References

Sources
 
 
 
 
 

Seyyed Hossein Nasr
Books about Islam